Charlotte Kähr (born 27 June 2001) is a Swiss handball player for Buxtehuder SV in the Frauen Handball-Bundesliga and the Swiss national team.

When Kähr was 16 year old, she made her official debut in the SPAR Premium League for LK Zug.  She won both the Swiss Championship and the Swiss Cup in 2021. She was awarded as Most Valuabe player for the league in the 2020-21 season. In May 2021, she signed a 2-year contract with Buxtehuder SV.

She made her debut on the Swiss national team on 22 November 2018, against Czech Republic.

Achievements
Bundesliga:
Bronze: 2022
 SPAR Premium League
Winner: 2021
 Swiss Women's Cup
Winner: 2021

References

External links

2001 births
Living people
German female handball players
People from Zürich
Sportspeople from Zürich
Expatriate handball players
Swiss expatriate sportspeople in Germany